The Douglas County Courthouse is a courthouse located in Waterville, Washington, the county seat of Douglas County, Washington.

The Douglas County Courthouse was constructed in 1905 to replace an earlier, wood-frame building.

It was added to the National Register of Historic Places in 1975.

References

1900s architecture in the United States
Courthouses on the National Register of Historic Places in Washington (state)
Courthouses in Washington (state)
Victorian architecture in Washington (state)
Government buildings completed in 1905
Douglas County, Washington
1905 establishments in Washington (state)